Borsa  may refer to:

Places

Greece
Borsas, a village in the municipal unit of Mykines, Argolis, Greece

Norway
Børsa, a village in Skaun municipality in Trøndelag county, Norway
Børsa (municipality), a former municipality in Trøndelag county, Norway
Børsa Church, a church in Skaun municipality in Trøndelag county, Norway

Romania
Borșa, a town in Maramureș County
Borșa, Cluj, a commune in Cluj County, which includes Borșa-Cătun and Borșa-Crestaia villages
Borșa, a village in Săcădat Commune, Bihor County
Borșa, a village in Vlădeni Commune, Iași County
Borșa (river), a river in Cluj County

Slovakia
Borša, a village in Slovakia
Hruba Borsa, a village and municipality in western Slovakia

People
Andrea Borsa (born 1972), Italian football player
Andy Borsa (1944–2016), American politician
Emilio Borsa (1857–1931), Italian painter
James Borsa (c. 1260 – 1325/1332), lord in the Kingdom of Hungary
Roger Borsa (1060/1 – 1111), son of Robert Guiscard, the Norman conqueror of southern Italy and Sicily
Roland Borsa (died 1301), voivod of Transylvania
Borsa Brown (born 1975), Hungarian author

Other
Borsa Italiana, Italy's main stock exchange
Borsa Istanbul, Turkey's stock exchange